Harut may refer to:
A variant of Harutyun, a given Armenian name. Also written Harout
Harut and Marut, one of two angels mentioned in the second Surah of the Qur'an.
Harut River (or Ardaskan River), a river of Afghanistan
Adraskan (or Harut), a town in western Afghanistan